Zerhamra (also written Zaghamra) is a village in the commune of Béni Abbès, in Béchar Province, Algeria. It lies beneath the Ougarta Range of the Sahara desert. A local road connects the village to the N6 highway near the town of Béni Abbès  to the northeast.

A Siderite (Group III AB), the heavy meteorite is a portion of the metallic core of a celestial body which fragmented during a powerful collision. The characteristic shape of the surface is indicative of erosion.

References

Neighbouring towns and cities

Populated places in Béchar Province